This is a summary of the year 2014 in New Zealand music.

Events

January
Joel Fletcher's remix of Savage's song "Swing" is certified platinum in Australia where it reached number two on the national singles chart.
Lorde wins two Grammy Awards for her hit "Royals" for "Song of the Year" and "Best Pop Solo Performance".

February
Lorde is named "Best International Female Solo Artist" at the 2014 BRIT Awards.

August
Kimbra released her second studio album "The Golden Echo".

References 

 
Music
2014 in music